Rhode Island Rays was an American women's soccer team, founded in XXXX. The team was a member of the Women's Premier Soccer League, the third tier of women's soccer in the United States and Canada, until 2006, when the team left the league and the franchise was terminated.

The team played its home games at...

The team's colors were...

Year-by-year

   

Soccer clubs in Rhode Island
Women's Premier Soccer League teams
Women's soccer clubs in the United States
2005 establishments in Rhode Island
2006 disestablishments in Rhode Island
Women's sports in Rhode Island